Bernardo Schiaffino (1678 – 6 May 1725) was an Italian sculptor of the Baroque period, active mainly in his natal city of Genoa.

He was one of two sculptors in his family, along with his younger brother Francesco Maria Schiaffino. He trained with Domenico Parodi. He befriended the Piola family of artists; Domenico Piola provided him with some designs, and Bernardo was close friends with his son Paolo Girolamo Piola. In his biography, it claims he died of melancholy after the death of his inseparable friend. Among his pupils was Francesco Queirolo.

References

1678 births
1725 deaths
17th-century Genoese people
18th-century Genoese people
17th-century Italian sculptors
18th-century Italian sculptors
Italian male sculptors
Italian Baroque sculptors
Artists from Genoa
18th-century Italian male artists